The National Violent Death Reporting System (abbreviated NVDRS) is an active surveillance system initiated by the Centers for Disease Control for collecting data regarding violent deaths in the United States. It does not collect any of its own data, but rather relies on data collected by other systems. It provides a unique advantage over other violent death reporting systems, as it creates a centralized database of relevant information. The initiative involves collaboration between state agencies and local police, coroners, and medical examiners, with the goal of creating a more complete and up-to-date database of violent deaths and their circumstances in the United States.

History
In 1999, six foundations pooled their resources to create the National Violent Injury Statistics System (NVISS), which also collected data regarding violent deaths and developed many of the techniques necessary to do so at multiple locations. The following year, a group of experts recommended that the Centers for Disease Control create a publicly funded system similar to the NVISS. Funding for the system was first appropriated by Congress in 2002, and the system was established that year. The NVDRS began collecting data in 2003 from six states, a number that increased to 17 by 2006 and 32 by 2016.

The system and its accompanying data became freely accessible online in November 2008. In 2013, the NVDRS moved to an online system that makes accessing its data easier.

References

External links

Centers for Disease Control and Prevention
Surveillance databases